Statistics of the Scottish Football League in season 1997–98.

Scottish Premier Division

Table

Top scorers

Scottish League Division One

Table

Top scorers

Scottish League Division Two

Table

Top scorers

Scottish League Division Three

See also
1997–98 in Scottish football

References

 
Scottish Football League seasons